Kivi-Tex is a services company headquartered in Copenhagen, Denmark.  It is the holding company of the textile services company De Forenede Dampvaskerier (DFD) and Elite Miljø.

History

De Forenede Dampvaskerier was founded by Kristian Peter Thorgaard when he Lunds Lunds Kitteldepot in 1958. In 1961, he acquired another company, Kivi. The name of his company was changed to Kivi Kittel and later to Kivi-Tex.

Kivi-Tex acquired Danish service company Elite Miljø in 2004. In 2017, it acquired Swedish textile services company Textilia from Accent Equity.

Operations
De Forenede Dampvaskerier operates 20 laundries in Scandinavia.

References

External links
 De Forenede Dampvaskerier

Holding companies of Denmark
Service companies of Denmark
Service companies based in Copenhagen
Companies based in Ballerup Municipality
Danish companies established in 1958